Legault is a surname of French-Canadian origin. Notable people with the surname include:

 Carl Legault (1923–83), Canadian politician
 Claude Legault (born 1963), Canadian actor
 Diane Legault (born 1956), Canadian politician
 Émile Legault (born 2000), Canadian soccer player
 François Legault (born 1957), Canadian politician and 32nd premier of Quebec
 Hugues Legault (born 1974), Canadian freestyle swimmer
 Josée Legault (born 1966), Canadian journalist
 Karine Legault (born 1978), Canadian freestyle swimmer
 Kyle Legault (born 1985), Canadian speedway rider
 Lance LeGault (1937–2012), American actor
 Léonard Legault (1935–2017), Canadian diplomat
 Paul Legault (born 1985), Canadian-American poet
 Suzanne Legault, former Information Commissioner of Canada
 Théodore Legault (1886–1935), Canadian politician
 Thierry Legault (born 1962), French astrophotographer

See also
 19458 Legault, an asteroid
 Legault, a character from the video game Fire Emblem